Aequispirella corula is a species of sea snail, a marine gastropod mollusk, unassigned in the superfamily Seguenzioidea.

Distribution
This marine species occurs off New Zealand

References

corula
Gastropods described in 1885
Gastropods of New Zealand